Kindergarten is a Soviet drama film by Yevgeny Yevtushenko, created by him on the basis of his own memories of a military childhood.

Plot
In Russia, during the Great Patriotic War, a 10-year-old boy goes to live with his grandmother. On the way to it, the train gets under bombardment, so Zhenya has to move slowly on foot to the destination, meeting many friendly and not very people.

Cast
 Sergey Gusak as Zhenya
 Galina Stakhanova as Zhenya's Grandmother
 Svetlana Yevstratova as Lilya
Igor Sklyar as Zhenya's Father
 Klaus Maria Brandauer as  German officer
 Nikolai Karachentsov as thief  Spire
 Leonid Markov as imaginary blind
 Yevgeny Yevtushenko as freaky chess player
 Mikhail Roshchin as episode
 Nika Turbina as episode

Criticism
Yevgeny Yevtushenko's film came out in the years of the poet's disgrace, so it was not by chance that he became the subject of Soviet criticism and found recognition in the West (after an out-of-competition show at the Venice Film Festival). The famous film critic Victor Dyomin called the picture worthless, while the film director Savva Kulish, after watching the film, praised the work of Yevtushenko, wishing him further success: Yevtushenko is trying to implement on the screen purely literary devices hence the obviously overestimated in comparison with the usual capacity in the movie capacity of plastic images, their literary type metaphorical. Sometimes this metaphoricity strikes accuracy and truth. Sometimes it seems deliberate, and then reveals a taste of literary. But before us is a clear attempt to try the film equipment on the utmost strain, and this attempt is fruitful not only for the writer, but also for the cinema.  Script writer Yevgeny Gabrilovich  supported the creative search for the poet.

Aleksandr Fyodorov: All this looks pretentious, secondary and even unprofessional. But the nonprofessionality of the author of the film in the cinema, as it is paradoxical, has also positive aspects. Yevtushenko removes the picture of the memory of his military childhood so that the mosaic of events consists of many unpolished, different and unequal episodes.

References

External links 
  
 Евгений Евтушенко устроил в Зиме «Детский сад»

1983 films
Mosfilm films
Soviet war drama films
Eastern Front of World War II films
1980s war drama films
1983 directorial debut films
1983 drama films
1980s Russian-language films